Coit v. Green, 404 U.S. 997 (1971), was a case in which the  United States Supreme Court  affirmed a decision that a  private school  which practiced  racial discrimination  could not be eligible for a  tax exemption.

Summary of findings
In Green v. Connally, the court declared that neither IRC 501(c)(3) nor IRC 170 provided for tax-exempt status or deductible contributions to any organization operating a private school that discriminates in admissions on the basis of race. Since this time, if a school has adopted and announced a racially non-discriminatory admissions policy and has not taken any overt action to discriminate in admissions, the Service concludes that the school has a racially non-discriminatory admissions policy. The U.S. Supreme Court, however, specifically did not rule on the hypothetical possibility of a school which discriminated against minorities for religious reasons.

In the interim, the IRS took steps to implement the nondiscrimination requirement including Revenue Ruling 71–447, 1971–2 C.B. 230, Revenue Procedure 72–54, 1972–2 C.B. 834, Revenue Procedure 75–50, 1975–2 C.B. 587, and Revenue Ruling 75–231, 1975–1 C.B. 158. Without comment, the Supreme Court affirmed the judgment of the United States District Court for the District of Columbia at the end of 1971 for the families in this case.

Results

A decade later, scores of schools had not changed policies and remained ineligible for tax-exempt status.

See also
United States Supreme Court cases during the Burger Court

References

Doe and Rabago v. Kamehameha Schools/Bernice Pauahi Bishop Estate, et al. (2007).
IRS (1982). Update on Private Schools.
Goluboff, R. L. (2000). "The Thirteenth Amendment and the Lost Origins of Civil Rights." Duke Law Journal, 50 Paper was presented at the 2000 Annual Meeting of the American Society for Legal History. p. 1609.

United States Supreme Court cases
1971 in United States case law
United States school desegregation case law
United States Supreme Court cases of the Burger Court
United States equal protection case law